Tartak is a Ukrainian rock group.

Tartak (Polish for sawmill) may also refer to:

Places
Tartak, Greater Poland Voivodeship
Tartak, Lublin Voivodeship
Tartak, Augustów County
Tartak, Siemiatycze County
Tartak, Sokółka County
Tartak, Suwałki County
Tartak, Mińsk County
Tartak, Ostrołęka County

Other uses
Tartak (Hebrew: תַּרְתָּק; Latin: Tharthac), a god mentioned in 2 Kings 17:31; see Succoth-benoth

See also
Tartaks, a river in Latvia